The Amor was a small German automobile built in limited numbers in Cologne from 1924 to 1925; the car had a 16 hp four-cylinder proprietary engine. Its name means "love" in Spanish and Portuguese.

Vintage vehicles
Defunct motor vehicle manufacturers of Germany